The Greasy Pole (in) is a painting by Francisco de Goya.

Like the others in his tapestry cartoons series, it is based on a popular scene of a vertical greased Cockaigne pole. The greasy pole was a popular theme of the iconography of the eighteenth century that Goya had already used for his tapestry drawings. During Cockaigne, boys climb and fight to reach the top of the pole. The background landscape is blurred, but it is possible to distinguish farms and a crowd gathered at the foot of the pole.

See also 
List of works by Francisco Goya
 Cockaigne
 Greasy pole

External links 
  Search from ArteHistoria.
  Search on fundaciongoyaenaragon.es.

Paintings by Francisco Goya